2-Chloro-6-fluorobenzaldehyde is a halogenated benzaldehyde derivative with the formula C6H3ClFCHO. It is an intermediate in the synthesis of other halogenated heterocyclic compounds.

Uses and preparation
2-Chloro-6-fluorobenzaldehyde is a synthetic intermediate in the production of dicloxacillin and flucloxacillin. In addition it is used in the production of pesticides.

2-Chloro-6-fluorobenzaldehyde is prepared by oxidation of 2-chloro-6-fluorotolulene by hydrogen peroxide.

References

Benzaldehydes
Fluoroarenes
Chloroarenes